Co-op Academy Leeds (formerly Primrose High School) is a co-operative academy in Leeds, West Yorkshire, England. It is a part of the Co-op Academies Trust, which is sponsored by The Co-operative Group.

Site
The school is in the eastern corner of Leeds city centre. The original site for the school was on Hill Street and Dolly Lane. The school had a main site and a separate annexe, which had a maths department, science department and a sixth form department. In September 2006 the school moved to a new purpose-built site, which is part of a PFI scheme.

Education Leeds held consultations in regards to closing Primrose High School and replacing it with The Co-operative Academy of Leeds on the same site, which would be sponsored by The Co-operative Group. Primrose High School closed in August 2011 and re-opened as The Co-operative academy of Leeds in September 2011.This school is near Shakespeare Primary School and Harehills Primary School.
In September 2018 it was renamed Co-op Academy Leeds in line with Co-op Academies Trust new branding and naming strategy.

Truancy
Primrose High School was criticised after a report, published in January 2008 and reported in the Yorkshire Evening Post, stated the school to have the second worst truancy rate for any secondary school in Leeds, the worst being the City of Leeds School in Woodhouse.

Truancy rates have dramatically improved since 2008 and The Co-operative Academy of Leeds' attendance for 2014–2015 academic year stands at 93.9%.

References

External links 
 

Academies in Leeds
Secondary schools in Leeds